La tiang is an ancient Thai snack. It is most well known from the Kap He Chom Khrueang Khao Wan poem composed during the reign of King Rama I by the crown prince who later became King Rama II. It comprises shrimp, pork and peanuts minced together and wrapped in a thin mesh-like omelette casing making a square shape.

Ingredients
La tiang has two parts: a mesh-shaped omelette wrapping and minced filling made from pork, shrimp, roasted peanuts, garlic, and coriander. It is seasoned with pepper, fish sauce, and coconut palm sugar.

Preparation
To prepare the mincemeat, chop up shallots, coriander root, garlic and pepper. Fry them all together. After that, add the minced pork, chopped shrimp and roasted peanuts. Season with fish sauce and coconut palm sugar. To prepare the egg wrapping, dip your fingers into the egg mixture and flick it on the pan in a lattice form until the egg is cooked. Lastly, place the egg around the minced filling to form a square shape.<ref></re

See also 
 List of Thai dishes

References 

Thai desserts and snacks